This is a list of notable individuals and organizations who voiced their endorsement of Ron DeSantis as the Republican Party's presidential nominee for the 2024 U.S. presidential election.

Former Executive Branch officials

 Ken Cuccinelli, acting U.S. Deputy Secretary of Homeland Security (2019–2021); Attorney General of Virginia (2010–2014); Republican nominee for Governor of Virginia in 2013
 Ed Rollins, White House Director of Political and Intergovernmental Affairs (1982–1983 and February–October 1985)
 Donald Tapia, U.S. Ambassador to Jamaica (2019–2021)

U.S. Senators

 Cynthia Lummis, U.S. Senator from Wyoming (2021–present); U.S. Representative from WY-AL (2009–2017); State Treasurer of Wyoming (1999–2007)
 Kevin Cramer, U.S. Senator from North Dakota (2019-present); U.S. Representative from ND-AL (2013-2019)

U.S. Representatives

 Chip Roy, U.S. Representative from TX-21 (2019–present)

Former
 Mo Brooks, U.S. Representative from AL-05 (2011–2023); candidate for U.S. Senate from Alabama in 2017 and 2022
 Matt Salmon, U.S. Representative from AZ-05 (2013–2017) and AZ-01 (1995–2001)
 Francis Rooney, U.S. Representative from FL-19 (2017–2021)
 Rodney Davis, U.S. Representative from IL-13 (2013–2023)
 Lou Barletta, U.S. Representative from PA-11 (2011–2019); Republican nominee for U.S. Senate from Pennsylvania in 2018
 Tom Marino, U.S. Representative from PA-12 (January 2019) and PA-10 (2011–2019)

State executive officials
 John Dougall, State Auditor of Utah (2013–present); candidate for Lieutenant Governor of Utah in 2020

State legislators
 Scott Sandall, Utah State Senator from District 1 (2023–present) and District 17 (2019–2023)
 Todd Weiler, Utah State Senator from District 8 (2023–present) and District 23 (2012–2023)
 Lincoln Fillmore, Utah State Senator from District 17 (2023–present) and District 10 (2016–2023)
 Daniel McCay, Utah State Senator from District 18 (2023–present) and District 11 (2019–2023); candidate for Lieutenant Governor of Utah in 2020
 Kirk Cullimore Jr., Utah State Senator from District 19 (2023–present) and District 9 (2019–2023)
 Mike Kennedy, Utah State Senator from District 21 (2023–present) and District 14 (2021–2023); candidate for U.S. Senate from Utah in 2018
 Jake Anderegg, Utah State Senator from District 22 (2023–present) and District 13 (2017–2023)
 Curt Bramble, Utah State Senator from District 24 (2023–present) and District 16 (2001–2023)
 Mike McKell, Utah State Senator from District 25 (2023–present) and District 7 (2021–2023)
 Derrin Owens, Utah State Senator from District 27 (2023–present) and District 24 (2021–2023)
 Evan Vickers, Utah State Senator from District 28 (2013–present); Majority Leader of the Utah Senate (2019–present)
 Phil Green, Michigan State Representative from District 84 (2019–2022) and District 67 (2023–present)
 Bryan Posthumus, Michigan State Representative from District 73 (2021–2022) and District 90 (2023–present)
 Jefferson Moss, Utah State Representative from District 2 (2017–present); Majority Whip of the Utah House of Representatives (2021–present)
 Dan Johnson, Utah State Representative from District 4 (2019–present)
 Casey Snider, Utah State Representative from District 5 (2019–present)
 Ryan Wilcox, Utah State Representative from District 7 (2009–2014 and 2021–present)
 Mike Schultz, Utah State Representative from District 12 (2015–present); Majority Leader of the Utah House of Representatives (2021–present)
 Karen M. Peterson, Utah State Representative from District 13 (2022–present)
 Karianne Lisonbee, Utah State Representative from District 14 (2017–present)
 Timothy Hawkes, Utah State Representative from District 18 (2015–present)
 Raymond Ward, Utah State Representative from District 19 (2015–present)
 Melissa Garff Ballard, Utah State Representative from District 20 (2019–present)
 Brady Brammer, Utah State Representative from District 27 (2019–present)
 Jordan Teuscher, Utah State Representative from District 42 (2021–present)
 Ken Ivory, Utah State Representative from District 47 (2011–2019 and 2021–present)
 Keven Stratton, Utah State Representative from District 48 (2013–present)
 Robert Spendlove, Utah State Representative from District 49 (2014–present)
 Susan Pulsipher, Utah State Representative from District 50 (2017–present)
 Candice Pierucci, Utah State Representative from District 52 (2019–present)
 Kera Birkeland, Utah State Representative from District 53 (2020–present)
 Kay Christofferson, Utah State Representative from District 56 (2013–present)
 Jon Hawkins, Utah State Representative from District 57 (2019–present)
 Marsha Judkins, Utah State Representative from District 61 (2018–present)
 Jefferson S. Burton, Utah State Representative from District 66 (2021–present)
 Doug Welton, Utah State Representative from District 67 (2021–present)
 Christine Watkins, Utah State Representative from District 69 (2009–2012 and 2017–present)
 Walt Brooks, Utah State Representative from District 75 (2016–present)

County officials
 Aimee Winder Newton, Salt Lake County councilor from District 3 (2014–present); candidate for Governor of Utah in 2020

Notable individuals
 Azealia Banks, rapper, singer, and songwriter
 Kenneth C. Griffin, hedge fund manager, entrepreneur, and investor
 Lachlan Murdoch, businessman and mass media heir
 Rupert Murdoch, investor and media proprietor
 Elon Musk, business magnate and investor
 Stephen M. Ross, real estate developer, philanthropist, and sports team owner

Notes

References

Ron DeSantis
2024 Republican Party (United States) presidential campaigns
2024 United States Republican presidential primaries
Republican Party